Ujagar Singh Sekhwan (1924–1990) was an Indian politician from the state of Punjab. He is a former president of  the Shiromani Akali Dal (SAD). He was born in the Sekhwan village of Gurdaspur district, Punjab. He was elected to the Punjab Legislative Assembly in 1977 and again in 1980 as a SAD candidate from the Kahnuwan assembly constituency. He was married to Tej Kaur. His son Sewa Singh Sekhwan was  the minister for Information & Public Relations in Punjab.

References

1924 births
1990 deaths
People from Gurdaspur district
Punjab, India MLAs 1977–1980
Punjab, India MLAs 1980–1985
Shiromani Akali Dal politicians